Anne Merklinger (born November 15, 1958) is CEO of Own the Podium. She is a retired Canadian curler. She won the Tournament of Hearts, the Canadian women's championship, in 1990 and went on to win the bronze medal at the World Championships. She curled out of the Rideau Curling Club.

Before curling, Merklinger was a notable swimmer. In the late 1970s, she was a member of the Canadian national swimming team.

Following her curling career, Merklinger served as director general of the Canoe Kayak Canada. She also worked with the Commission for the Inclusion of Athletes with a Disability and served as a board member for Special Olympics Canada. Merklinger was named CEO of the Own the Podium program on January 26, 2012, succeeding Alex Baumann and following an interim period as co-CEO.

Curling career 
In 1976, she skipped Prince Edward Island at the 1976 Canadian Junior Curling Championships.

Her team lost to Maureen Bonar of Manitoba in the semi-final.

Capping off a season that included her team attending the 1997 Canadian Olympic Trials, Merklinger would go all the way to the final before losing to Cathy Borst of Alberta in the final.

Merklinger attended her last Hearts in  where she once again made it to the final. This time she lost to Kelley Law's team from British Columbia. Merklinger failed to qualify for any further Hearts after that. After the 2005–06 season, where her team failed to even make the provincial championships, she decided to retire from the game.

Personal life
Merklinger comes from a large curling family. Her brother, Dave Merklinger is a high-profile ice maker, while her younger sisters Breanne and Lee are curlers as well. Her other brother, Bill was the alternate for the Northwest Territories at the 2015 Tim Hortons Brier.

Awards
Marj Mitchell Sportsmanship Award (1998)
Scotties Tournament of Hearts Shot of the Week Award (1998)
 Ottawa Sports Hall of Fame (2010)
 Scotties Tournament of Hearts Builders Award (2010)

References

External links

Living people
1958 births
Canadian female swimmers
Universiade medalists in swimming
Canadian women curlers
Curlers from Prince Edward Island
Curling broadcasters
Swimmers from London, Ontario
Swimmers from Ottawa
Curlers from Ottawa
Universiade silver medalists for Canada
Canada Cup (curling) participants
Medalists at the 1977 Summer Universiade
20th-century Canadian women
21st-century Canadian women